Amanda Marie Marcotte (born September 2, 1977) is an American blogger and journalist who writes on feminism and politics from a liberal perspective. Marcotte has written for several online publications, including Slate, The Guardian, and Salon, where she is currently senior politics writer.

Early life
Born in El Paso, Texas, Marcotte (rhymes with far-caught, according to her) was raised in the small town of Alpine, Texas in the Trans-Pecos region. She graduated summa cum laude from St. Edward's University in Austin, Texas with a degree in English literature. Around 2004, she began writing for the liberal blog Pandagon.net, then later for Slate and The Guardian.

In 2004 Marcotte won a Koufax Award for her "Mouse Words" blog.

Career

Time magazine has called Marcotte "an outspoken voice of the left", writing, "there is a welcome wonkishness to Marcotte, who, unlike some star bloggers, is not afraid to parse policy with her readers." Time also called her blogging "provocative and profanity-laced."

In early 2007 Marcotte made several controversial statements on her blog, including criticism of the men falsely accused in the Duke lacrosse case, using vulgar language to refer to Catholic doctrine on the Virgin birth of Jesus, and describing the Catholic Church's opposition to birth control as motivated by a desire to force women to "bear more tithing Catholics."

Marcotte has given presentations at Skepticon, SXSW, Women In Secularism 2, and SkepchickCON. She was formerly on the speakers' bureau of the Secular Student Alliance.

Marcotte is the author of It's a Jungle Out There: The Feminist Survival Guide to Politically Inhospitable Environments (2008), Get Opinionated (2010) and Troll Nation: How The Right Became Trump-Worshipping Monsters Set On Rat-F*cking Liberals, America, and Truth Itself (2018).

As of 2021, Marcotte writes full-time for Salon; her stories are often republished and syndicated through partner sites including Raw Story and Alternet.

John Edwards Campaign 
On January 30, 2007, John Edwards's 2008 presidential campaign hired Marcotte as its blogmaster, saying that while Edwards was "personally offended" by some of Marcotte's remarks about the Catholic Church, her job as their blogmaster was secure.

Following criticism, Marcotte announced her resignation from the Edwards campaign. In an article for Salon a few days later, she said her resignation was a result of being targeted by the "right-wing smear machine."

Personal life 
Marcotte lives in Brooklyn, New York. Her boyfriend, Marc Faletti, is vice president of Multimedia for Rewire.News and owns a record store called Latchkey in South Philadelphia.

References

External links 
 Pandagon blog (defunct)
 Amanda Marcotte's author page at Slate

1977 births
Living people
American bloggers
American feminists
Feminist bloggers
Writers from Austin, Texas
People from Alpine, Texas
People from El Paso, Texas
St. Edward's University alumni
The Guardian people
University of Texas at Austin faculty
Critics of the Catholic Church
American secularists
American women bloggers